Terence "Terry" Dolan is an English professional middleweight boxer of the 1940s and 1950s.

Boxing career

Professional
Terry Dolan's first professional boxing bout was a defeat by Joe Carroll on Friday 25 November 1949, this was followed by fights including; defeat by George Roe (Midlands (England) Area middleweight champion), Dolan's final professional bout was a defeat by Rob/Bob Conway on Monday 4 October 1954.

References

External links
 

English male boxers
People from Horbury
Place of birth missing
Possibly living people
Year of birth missing
Middleweight boxers